StuStaCulum is a theatre festival at the Studentenstadt in Munich, Germany.

Theatre festivals in Germany
Festivals in Munich